Foresthome is a rural locality in the Shire of Hinchinbrook, Queensland, Australia. In the  Foresthome had a population of 87 people.

Geography 
The North Coast railway line enters the locality from the south and exits to the north. There are two railway stations on the line in the locality, but both are now abandoned:

 Gairlock railway station
 Lilypond railway station

History 
Foresthome State School opened on 26 November 1935 and closed on 15 March 1993.

In the  Foresthome had a population of 87 people.

References 

Shire of Hinchinbrook
Localities in Queensland